Esad Dugalić (10 January 1947 – 27 May 2011) was a Bosnian football goalkeeper.

Playing career

Club
Born in Mostar, SR Bosnia and Herzegovina, back then still part of Yugoslavia, he started playing in FK Velež Mostar in the Yugoslav First League, however he spent most of the tim as a substitute goalkeeper, first because of Ivan Ćurković and then because of Enver Marić.  That is why he left Velež in and has played in a number of other Yugoslav clubs, namely FK Sloboda Užice, FK Sarajevo, NK Osijek and FK Igman Konjic.  In 1974, his former teammate Ćurković arranged him a move to France to play with AS Saint-Étienne.  He debuted in the French League 1 in the 1976–77 season, however he spent most of the time playing in the B team.  Earlier he had a spell in Austria with First Vienna FC in the 1966–67 season.

International
He played 3 matches for the Yugoslav Olympic team.

Managerial career
In 1992, he moved to Qatar where he became a coach. He was also the assistant of Džemal Hadžiabdić at Al-Ittihad.  He had just had signed a two-year contract to be assistant of Mehmed Baždarević when, unexpectedly, he died on the night of 26–27 May 2011 in his summer house in Blagaj while on a visit.

References

1947 births
2011 deaths
Sportspeople from Mostar
Association football goalkeepers
Bosnia and Herzegovina footballers
Yugoslav footballers
FK Velež Mostar players
First Vienna FC players
FK Sloboda Užice players
FK Sarajevo players
NK Osijek players
FK Igman Konjic players
AS Saint-Étienne players
Yugoslav First League players
Austrian Football Bundesliga players
Ligue 1 players
Yugoslav expatriate footballers
Expatriate footballers in Austria
Yugoslav expatriate sportspeople in Austria
Expatriate footballers in France
Yugoslav expatriate sportspeople in France
Bosnia and Herzegovina expatriate sportspeople in Qatar